Anarta farnhami is a species of cutworm or dart moth in the family Noctuidae. It is found in North America.

The MONA or Hodges number for Anarta farnhami is 10232.

Subspecies
These two subspecies belong to the species Anarta farnhami:
 Anarta farnhami farnhami
 Anarta farnhami palaearctica (Hacker, 1998)

References

Further reading

 
 
 

Anarta (moth)
Articles created by Qbugbot
Moths described in 1873